Ershad Sikder (1955 – 10 May 2004) was a Bangladeshi politician, criminal, and serial killer, known for committing various crimes such as murder, torture, theft, robbery and others. He was sentenced to death for murder, and subsequently executed on 10 May 2004.

A song by Abdus Sattar Mohantan, titled "I will be dead", has been popularized throughout the country as Sikder's song.

Biography

Early life 
Sikder was born in the Madargona village of Nalchity Upazila, Jhalokati District. His father was Bande Ali. Between 1966 and 1967, Sikder moved from his birthplace to the Khulna District. After arriving in Khulna, Ershad worked as a railway worker for some time. From there, he began gradually robbing along the railway lines and joined a gang. Later, he formed his own gang and earned the name Ranga Chora from the locals.

Between 1976 and 1977, he formed another gang named Ramada Bahini, which was involved in theft, robberies and terrorist activities along the Khulna Railway Station and the Ghat area. Together with his gang, Ershad occupied the 4th and 5th areas of Ghat, making it his exclusive regulator.

Entry into politics 
In 1982, after the rise of former president Hussain Muhammad Ershad, Sikder entered politics through the Jatiya Party. In the 1988 election during the military rule, Sikder was elected as the Commissioner of Ward 8. After forming the BNP government in 1991, Sikder joined it. On 26 December 1996, he again changed his party to the Awami League, but soon after being criticized, he was expelled. At the time of his 1999 arrest, he was still the Commissioner of Ward 8.

Criminal acts and murders 
After entering politics, Sikder's power grew. From 1984 to 1986, he was involved in the possession of Khulna properties, occupying private property, the drug trade, extortion and other criminal activities. In 1991, he drove out the owner of an ice factory named Rafiq, from the 4th Ghat area, appropriated the ice factory and forced all traders to buy ice from him.

It is also known that he used the ice factory as his torture center. Ershad was accused of more than 60 murders, together with one of his collaborators, Rajasakshi Nure Alam. The latter later gave a statement in the court describing 24 killings, further claiming that Sikder has more than 70 victims, although only one weapon was recovered from his house, known as the "Swarnakamal".

Personal life 
It is known that Sikder was married six times. His first wife was Khodeja Begum, whom he married in 1973. Another wife, named Sanjida Akter Shobha, received a luxurious gold house. Aside from them, there were a Taslima of Rupsha Rajapur village, a Farida of Bagerhat, Rampal Upazila; another unknown wife and a Durgargaire of Paikgacha. Nure Alam also alleged that his wife Hira was tortured by Ershad.

Ershad's first wife Khodeja gave birth to four children: three sons and a daughter. After his arrest, a fifth child was born, a girl named Jannatul Noorin Emily Essa to his second wife, Sanjida Nahar Shova. Jannatul Nawrin Esha committed suicide on 4 March 2022 in Subasto Tower, Gulshan, Dhaka.

Arrest and death 
Sikder was arrested in 1999, with 43 cases filed under his name. During a trial at the lower court, he was sentenced to death in seven murder cases, along with additional four life sentences. He tried to appeal the decision by writing a petition to President Iajuddin Ahmed, but he rejected the appeal, and Sikder was executed at the Khulna Central jail on 10 May 2004. He was imprisoned in Khulna District Jail. Fazlur Rahman, Police inspector and Jhikargachha Police Station, bought his house in Khulna. This prompted an investigation by the ministry of Home Affairs in April 2004.

In 2005, former Prime Minister Sheikh Hasina identified the arrest of Sikder as evidence of the judiciary functioning to Asma Jahangir and criticised the government of Bangladesh for using Rapid Action Battalion to kill criminals extrajudicially.

Popular culture
 In 2004 a Bangladeshi biographical thriller film, Khuni Shikder, was directed by Monowar Hossain Khokon.
 Kal Bhairaber Ghat, a book of Indian author Binod Ghoshal, based on the life of Ershad Sikder was published in 2020.

See also 
 List of serial killers by country
 List of serial killers by number of victims

References 

1955 births
2004 deaths
Bangladeshi people convicted of murder
Executed Bangladeshi people
Executed Bangladeshi serial killers
Executed gangsters
Executed politicians
Extortionists
Jatiya Party politicians
Male serial killers
Politicians convicted of murder
Pages with unreviewed translations
People convicted of robbery
People convicted of theft
People executed by Bangladesh by hanging
People executed for murder
People from Jhalokati district
Torturers